Roto-o-Rangi or Rotoorangi is a rural community in the Waipa District and Waikato region of New Zealand's North Island, located south of Cambridge and north-east of Te Awamutu.

Parts of northern Roto-o-Rangi have been undergoing urban development since the construction of the State Highway 1 Cambridge Expressway, as part of the expansion of Cambridge. The rest of Roto-o-Rangi is sparely populated with a small number of homes and businesses, including a furniture shop run out of a converted dairy farm barnhouse.

Roto-o-rangi translates to Lake of Heaven, referring to a lake that once covered the area.

History

European settlement

A European farmer and three of his workers arrived in 1864 and drained the lake to create rolling farm, under a lease agreement with local Māori that some Māori did not agree to.

The area became the site of conflict during the Waikato War. A fortification was built to accommodate 60 men on the main road between Cambridge and Te Awamutu. The last recorded European death from the war was farm worker Tim Sullivan on 24 April 1873; the pocket knife he had been carrying shortly before his death is on display at Cambridge Museum.

Modern history

The Gricelands cream skimming factory was built at Roto-o-rangi in 1903. Settlers had to built their own roads to the factory. A Cambridge-based teacher and post-master opened a school in the settlement two years later, in February 1905, sending children home once a week with letters from their parents.

The Roto-o-Rangi Memorial Hall was opened on 8 September 1938, following a fundraising campaign by the local community. A supper room was added in 1949, and the hall was expanded with a new roof in 1958.

The hall has been a venue for many community events. Dances were held at the hall through the decades, with women usually outnumbering men. The local school, Country Women's Institute, Federated Farmers, Young Farmers Club, Playcentre, The Ping Pong Club, Indoor Bowls, Tennis Club, church groups, jazz musicians, ballet classes and politicians have also used the hall for events.

Roto O Rangi Road has recently been the site of fatal crashes.

Demographics
Roto-o-Rangi locality is in two SA1 statistical areas which cover . The SA1 areas are part of the larger Rotoorangi statistical area.

The SA1 areas had a population of 345 at the 2018 New Zealand census, an increase of 51 people (17.3%) since the 2013 census, and an increase of 72 people (26.4%) since the 2006 census. There were 123 households, comprising 183 males and 159 females, giving a sex ratio of 1.15 males per female, with 78 people (22.6%) aged under 15 years, 75 (21.7%) aged 15 to 29, 162 (47.0%) aged 30 to 64, and 27 (7.8%) aged 65 or older.

Ethnicities were 93.0% European/Pākehā, 7.8% Māori, 1.7% Pacific peoples, 3.5% Asian, and 1.7% other ethnicities. People may identify with more than one ethnicity.

Although some people chose not to answer the census's question about religious affiliation, 61.7% had no religion, 27.0% were Christian, 0.9% had Māori religious beliefs and 2.6% had other religions.

Of those at least 15 years old, 45 (16.9%) people had a bachelor's or higher degree, and 42 (15.7%) people had no formal qualifications. 63 people (23.6%) earned over $70,000 compared to 17.2% nationally. The employment status of those at least 15 was that 171 (64.0%) people were employed full-time, 39 (14.6%) were part-time, and 6 (2.2%) were unemployed.

Rotoorangi statistical area

The statistical area had a population of 1,686 at the 2018 New Zealand census, an increase of 138 people (8.9%) since the 2013 census, and an increase of 285 people (20.3%) since the 2006 census. There were 591 households, comprising 864 males and 822 females, giving a sex ratio of 1.05 males per female. The median age was 37.9 years (compared with 37.4 years nationally), with 390 people (23.1%) aged under 15 years, 279 (16.5%) aged 15 to 29, 813 (48.2%) aged 30 to 64, and 204 (12.1%) aged 65 or older.

Ethnicities were 91.8% European/Pākehā, 11.9% Māori, 0.9% Pacific peoples, 2.8% Asian, and 1.2% other ethnicities. People may identify with more than one ethnicity.

The percentage of people born overseas was 13.3, compared with 27.1% nationally.

Although some people chose not to answer the census's question about religious affiliation, 54.4% had no religion, 35.2% were Christian, 0.5% had Māori religious beliefs and 2.1% had other religions.

Of those at least 15 years old, 219 (16.9%) people had a bachelor's or higher degree, and 240 (18.5%) people had no formal qualifications. The median income was $42,600, compared with $31,800 nationally. 297 people (22.9%) earned over $70,000 compared to 17.2% nationally. The employment status of those at least 15 was that 768 (59.3%) people were employed full-time, 219 (16.9%) were part-time, and 39 (3.0%) were unemployed.

Education

Puahue School, another state primary school for Year 1 to 6 students, is located southeast of the township. The school opened in 1912.

Both schools are co-educational. Rolls are as of

References

Waipa District
Populated places in Waikato